Guillermo Moncada (nicknamed "Guillermón" since his childhood, due to his large size) was one of 29 Cuban generals in the Cuban War of Independence.

He was born in Santiago, Cuba, on June 25, 1841. A former carpenter, he later became a black folk hero, renowned for ending the business of slavehunter Miguel Pérez Céspedes. His father, Narciso Veranes, was a freed slave and did not want his children have his name, so Guillermó took his mother's last name, Dominga Moncada.

He learnt to read and write when he was a child and later turn out to be a writer. He became a carpenter, a job with which he could earn money for his living.

Activities in Revolution 
Guillermo Moncada, could improve in the Cuban Revolution and fought for independence. He became a notable black officer in three wars against Spain (1868–1878, 1879–1880, 1895–1898).

José Martí appointed him head of the easternmost province of the country during the preparation of the War of 1895. After giving the order for the uprising to this province, Guillermón moved to Alto Songo, where he rose at dawn on February 24.

The Moncada Barracks entered history again on July 26, 1953, when the Moncada Barracks was attacked by a group of revolutionaries led by Fidel Castro Ruz.

Ten year war (1868-1878) 
His comrades in the army called him Guillermón, for his stature and courage in battles The son of a very poor black family, he was among the first to join the insurgent ranks in 1868 and, thanks to his bravery, he rose to the rank of Brigade General of the Liberation Army.

Generalissimo Máximo Gómez said about him: "He has leadership skills and great strategic ability".

Little war, prison in Spain and other actions 
Despite being one of the protagonists of the events in Santiago, Cuba on August 26, 1879, where the Little War began, he did not join until four days after it attacked the La Borgita sugar mill.

Calixto García, being president of the Cuban Revolutionary Committee, appointed him head of the forces of the center and south of the Oriente province, with the rank of Major General.

Tribute 
In his honor, the barracks where the No. 1 Regiment of Santiago de Cuba was located, was named after him.

Death 
Guillermo Moncada died in 1895 of tuberculosis in his camp in Joturito, Mucaral, municipality of Alto Songo, Santiago de Cuba after spending years in harsh Spanish prisons.

The Moncada Barracks and Estadio Guillermón Moncada were both named in his honour.

References

Abelardo Padrón Valdez. Guillermón Moncada. Vida y hazañas de un general. Editorial Letras Cubanas, 1980.

1841 births
Cuban soldiers
1895 deaths
People from Santiago de Cuba
Carpenters
People of the Cuban War of Independence
People of the Ten Years' War